"Fish Out of Water" is the fourth episode of the third season of the American animated television series BoJack Horseman. It was written by Elijah Aron and Jordan Young, and directed by Mike Hollingsworth. The episode was released in the United States, along with the rest of season three, via Netflix on July 22, 2016. Angela Bassett provides her voice in a guest appearance in the episode.

The episode features BoJack travelling to a film festival in the ocean, where he wears an oxygen-filled bubble to continue breathing. Notably, the episode features less than three minutes of audible dialogue.

In 2017, the episode was nominated for the Writers Guild of America Award for Television: Animation at the 69th WGA Awards. The episode "Stop the Presses" from the same season won the award. The episode was also nominated for Best Animated Television Production at the 44th Annie Awards.

Plot 

Ana Spanakopita sends BoJack to the world's biggest underwater film festival to promote Secretariat. Unfortunately, ex-Secretariat director Kelsey Jannings is also attending. Faced with the thought of seeing her, BoJack panics: not only will he have to have an awkward confrontation, he will have to do it underwater, where speaking is inhibited by his helmet. BoJack goes to the festival lobby where press events are underway. A group of fish journalists takes his picture, so he poses for them—giving them the thumbs-up sign, not knowing that this gesture is offensive in Pacific Ocean City. He notices Kelsey sadly trying to drum up interest in her movie, so he tries to write her an apology note, but she disappears before he can give it to her.

BoJack falls asleep on the bus, where he has to help a male seahorse give birth, and becomes stranded far from the city. As he starts his long walk back to the festival, he realizes that one of the baby seahorses clung to him, so he reluctantly decides to find its dad. Following many misadventures, he reunites the baby with its father, but it turns out that it was not missed. The seahorse dad invites BoJack in for dinner and even offers him money, but BoJack declines. The dad seems to ask, "What do you want?" but BoJack does not know. He leaves, depressed and envious of the seahorse family.

BoJack catches a cab back to the hotel. En route, he writes a heartfelt apology note to Kelsey. He arrives too late to attend the premiere, so he returns to the hotel just in time for the afterparty, where he learns that Secretariat was a huge hit. As Kelsey leaves the party, BoJack runs after her cab, but by the time he reaches her window, his note has become runny and blurred. Kelsey speeds off without knowing what he wanted to say.

As BoJack stands at a crosswalk, a man with a helmet yells at him by pressing a button on the collar. Realizing that he could speak the whole time, BoJack presses the button and the episode finishes with him saying, "Oh you have got to be kidding—"

Reception 
"Fish Out of Water" received critical acclaim, with many critics calling it one of the series' best episodes, and one of the best television episodes of 2016. Les Chappell of AV Club described the episode as "nothing short of a masterpiece, a culmination of both BoJack Horseman's unique animation style and its views on isolation and connection". Joe.ie's Rory Cashin called it "one of the greatest episodes of TV ever made". For Vulture, Jesse David Fox praised the episode as "a must-watch", noting that "the best part is, you don't have to have watched a single other episode of the series to love it".

References

External links 
 "Fish Out of Water" on Netflix
 

BoJack Horseman episodes
2016 American television episodes